The 2021 North Hertfordshire District Council election took place on 6 May 2021 to elect 17 of the 49 members of North Hertfordshire District Council in England. This was on the same day as other local elections around the country. This election had originally been due to take place in May 2020, but was postponed due to the COVID-19 pandemic.

The council remained under no overall control, with a Labour and Liberal Democrat coalition continuing to run the council. Martin Stears-Handscomb, leader of the Labour group and leader of the council prior to the election, lost his seat at this election; he had chosen to contest Letchworth South East rather than the Hitchin Oughton seat he had previously held, which put him directly challenging the Conservative leader, David Levett, who retained the seat. Elizabeth Dennis-Harburg was appointed new leader of the Labour group and leader of the council after the election, with the Liberal Democrat leader, Paul Clark, continuing to serve as deputy leader of the council.

Overall results
The overall results were as follows:

Ward results
The results for each ward were as follows. Where the previous incumbent was standing for re-election they are marked with an asterisk(*). A double dagger(‡) indicates a sitting councillor contesting a different ward.

Baldock East

 
 
 

 
Changes from the 2016 election.

Baldock Town

Chesfield

 
 

 
The result was initially a tie, with Terry Tyler (Liberal Democrat) and Dominic Griffiths (Conservative) both receiving 727 votes; they drew straws for an extra tie-break vote.

Hitchin Bearton

Hitchin Highbury

Hitchin Oughton

 
 
 
 

 
Changes from the 2018 election.

Hitchin Priory

 
 
 
 

 
Changes from the 2018 election.

Hitchin Walsworth

Hitchwood, Offa and Hoo

Knebworth

 
 
 

 
Changes from the 2018 election.

Letchworth East

 
 
 
 

 
Changes from the 2018 election.

Letchworth Grange

Letchworth South East

Letchworth South West

Letchworth Wilbury

 
 

 
Changes from the 2018 election.

This Letchworth Wilbury seat had been previously held by Labour councillor Deepak Sangha, but had been vacant since his resignation in March 2020, but no by-election could be held due to the COVID-19 pandemic.

Royston Meridian

 
 
 

 
The Royston Meridian by-election was triggered by the resignation of Conservative councillor Bill Davidson.

Royston Palace

 
 
 

 
The Royston Palace by-election had been triggered by the resignation of Conservative councillor Ben Lewis, who had resigned in March 2020, but no by-election could be held until 2021 due to the COVID-19 pandemic.

By-elections

Hitchin Highbury
The Hitchin Highbury by-election was triggered by the death of Liberal Democrat councillor Paul Clark, who was his party's group leader and deputy leader of the council. The Liberal Democrats retained the seat. Ruth Brown was appointed new leader of the Liberal Democrat group and deputy leader of the council following Paul Clark's death.

References

North Hertfordshire District Council election
May 2021 events in the United Kingdom
2021
2020s in Hertfordshire